The play-offs of the 2022 Billie Jean King Cup Europe/Africa Zone Group II were the final stages of the Group II zonal competition involving teams from Europe and Africa. Using the positions determined in their pools, the seven teams faced off to determine their placing in the 2022 Billie Jean King Cup Europe/Africa Zone Group II. The top two teams advanced to Group I, and the bottom two teams were relegated down to the Group III for 2023.

Pool results

Promotional play-offs 
The first-placed teams of each pool played against the second-placed teams of the other pool in head-to-head rounds. The winner of each round advanced to the 2023 Europe/Africa Zone Group I.

Norway vs. Israel

Lithuania vs. Egypt

Relegation play-offs 
The third-placed teams of the pools played against each other in a head-to-head round. The loser was relegated to 2023 Europe/Africa Zone Group III, alongside Finland who finished fourth in Pool B.

Greece vs. Luxembourg

Final placements 

References

External links 
 Billie Jean King Cup website

2022 Billie Jean King Cup Europe/Africa Zone